William Patrick Spencer Gold (born 14 September 1996), known professionally as Wilbur Soot, is a British Twitch streamer, YouTuber, and musician. He first became known in 2017 for his work with the group comedy YouTube channel SootHouse, where he made recurring appearances and was the lead editor and a co-founder. He later started his own channel, Wilbur Soot, in March 2019. Gold released his first single, "The 'Nice Guy' Ballad", in January 2018. His sixth single, "Your New Boyfriend", peaked at No. 65 on the UK Singles Chart. Gold is co-founder of the British indie rock band Lovejoy, where he is one of the songwriters, the lead vocalist and the rhythm guitarist. In 2021, they released Pebble Brain, their second EP, which debuted at No. 12 on the UK Albums Chart.

Online career

YouTube 
Gold first became known in 2017 for his work on the group YouTube channel, SootHouse, which was founded by Gold and some of his friends. This channel consisted mostly of reaction videos, with its members discussing memes and life hacks, among other topics. On May 30, 2019, the SootHouse channel reached 1 million subscribers.

Gold's main channel, Wilbur Soot, was created on 29 March 2019. This channel reached 1 million subscribers on 8 April 2020, and, it has amassed over 6.34 million subscribers.

Livestreaming 
Gold also actively live streams on Twitch, where, he has amassed over 4.6 million followers, making him the 40th most-followed channel on the platform.

In 2020, Gold joined the roleplay-focused Minecraft server The Dream SMP, run by eponymous YouTuber Dream. There, Gold founded the fictional nation of L'Manberg and eventually became a lead writer for the server's stories and folklore Gold has competed in multiple Minecraft tournaments, including MC Championships and Minecraft Monday.

On 4 August 2022, TommyInnit announced a book he and Gold had been writing called TommyInnit Says...The Quote Book. The book was released on 13 October 2022. The proceeds from the book were donated to the Sarcoma Foundation of America in honour of late Minecraft YouTuber Technoblade.

Musical career

Solo artist 

Gold released his first single, "The 'Nice Guy' Ballad", in January 2018. Gold first charted with his sixth single, "Your New Boyfriend", released in December 2020, which peaked on the UK Singles Chart at number 65. The song also appeared on the UK Indie Chart and the Irish Singles Chart, where it peaked at numbers 10 and 100, respectively. Gold has also appeared on several artist charts, including Billboard Emerging Artists Chart and Rolling Stone Top Breakthrough Chart. Gold's seventh single "Soft Boy" came out in September 2022.

Lovejoy 

Gold formed the indie rock band Lovejoy in 2021 with his friend Joe Goldsmith. The band consists of Gold as lead vocalist, co-songwriter, and rhythm guitarist; Goldsmith as the lead guitarist, co-songwriter and backing vocalist; Mark Boardman as the drummer, and co-songwriter; and Ash Kabosu as the bassist, and co-songwriter.

On 9 May 2021, Lovejoy released their first EP, titled Are You Alright?. On 20 May 2021, they debuted on Billboards Emerging Artists chart at number 10.Their second EP, Pebble Brain, was released on 14 October 2021, peaking at number 12 on the UK Albums Chart. Their first original single, "Call Me What You Like", was released on 10 February 2023, and peaked at number 32 on the UK singles chart.

Discography

Extended plays

Singles

Bibliography

See also 
 List of most-followed Twitch channels
 List of YouTubers

Notes

References

External links 
 
 
 

1996 births
21st-century British male musicians
English comedy musicians
English YouTubers
Gaming YouTubers
Indie folk musicians
Living people
Musicians from Suffolk
Musicians from Brighton and Hove
Twitch (service) streamers
YouTube channels launched in 2019
Comedy YouTubers
Music YouTubers
Minecraft YouTubers